Féminin/Féminin is a 2014 French Canadian web series about the lives of six lesbians living in Montreal. It was created by director Chloé Robichaud and Florence Gagnon (president of the LezSpreadTheWord website).
The first episode was posted on LezSpreadTheWord.com in early 2014 and the remaining 7 episodes were made available in June 2014 on the website femininfeminin.com. All episodes were written and directed by Robichaud.

In 2016, the series appeared on ICI ARTV.

Awards and recognition
The series won a Gemeaux Award.

References

External links

2014 web series debuts
2014 web series endings
Canadian drama web series
Canadian LGBT-related web series
Lesbian-related television shows
2010s Canadian LGBT-related drama television series